Mitiaro Airport (also known as Nukuroa Airport)  is an airport on Mitiaro in the Cook Islands.

Airlines and destinations 

Three flights per week are available to Rarotonga.

References

Airports in the Cook Islands
Mitiaro